The Merchimden is a river in Yakutia (Sakha Republic), Russia.

The river flows north of the Arctic Circle across a lonely, desolate area of Olenyoksky District devoid of settlements.

Course  
The Merchimden originates in the eastern fringes of the Central Siberian Plateau, very near the sources of the east-flowing Motorchuna. The river flows initially to the northeast, then roughly northwards all along its course, parallel to the Olenyok flowing in the same direction a little further to the west. In its last stretch it meanders very strongly. Finally it meets the right bank of the Olenyok  from its mouth. The confluence is just a little downstream from a very strong eastward bend of the Olenyok. There are a few small lakes just east of the confluence.

The river is frozen between the first half of October and early June.

Tributaries 

See also
List of rivers of Russia

References

External links 
Третий Космос... Виктор Музис (Exploring the Merchimden on a GT-T vehicle) 
Fishing & Tourism in Yakutia

Rivers of the Sakha Republic
Central Siberian Plateau
Tributaries of the Olenyok